Pallara is an outer southern suburb in the City of Brisbane, Queensland, Australia.

Geography 

History 

The name Pallara means flat land and is derived from a non-local Aboriginal word spelt with only one "l".

The suburb is relatively undeveloped with electricity supply only reaching Pallara in 1961.

Ritchie Road State School opened on 24 August 1959. The name was later changed to Pallara State School.

In 1997, the Pallara Parklands were opened on a remediated dump.

The median age of the Pallara population was 48 years of age, 10 years above the Australian median. 69.2% of people living in Pallara were born in Australia, compared to the national average of 66.7%.  69.3% of people spoke only English at home. The most common responses for religion were No Religion 27.7% and Catholic 20.3%.

Education
Pallara State School is a government primary (Prep-6) school for boys and girls at 39 Ritchie Road. In 2018, the school had an enrolment of 500 students with 30 teachers (29 full-time equivalent) and 22 non-teaching staff (13 full-time equivalent).

There are no secondary schools in Pallara. The nearest government secondary schools are Forest Lake State High School in neighbouring Forest Lake to the west, Glenala State High School in Durack to the north-west, and Calamvale Community College in Calamvale to the east.

Amenities 
There are a number of parks in the suburb:

 Blunder Creek Reserve
 Brookbent Road Park
 Paradise Road Park
 Sweets Road Park

References

External links

 
 Pallara. ourbrisbane.com via the Wayback Machine

Suburbs of the City of Brisbane
Populated places established in 1971
1971 establishments in Australia